Mary Jo Tiampo  (born 1962) is an American freestyle skier and world champion. 

She won a gold medal in moguls at the FIS Freestyle World Ski Championships 1986 in Tignes.

References

External links 
 

1962 births
Living people
American female freestyle skiers